Iyamho is a small town in Etsako West local government area of Edo State, Nigeria. Edo University, Iyamho is located here. Iyamho is one of the 21 towns/villages that constitute Uzaire clan in Etsako West, Edo State. The major religion include Christianity, Islam and traditional.

The distance between Iyamo and Abuja, the Nigeria capital is 317.8 km (or 5 hours and 20 minutes drive);  Iyamho to Benin City, the capital of Edo State is 170.6 km (or 2 hours and 46 minutes drive ) and  Auchi is 20.1 km (27 minutes).

The postcode is 312102

Notable people
Adams Oshiomole, Nigerian politician

References

Populated places in Edo State